Beverly Hills Housewife is a 1967 painting by David Hockney, part of his California Dreaming series. It depicts the American philanthropist Betty Freeman standing on the patio of her luxury home in Los Angeles, California. The painting was purchased by Freeman upon its completion and formed the centrepiece of her art collection. When Freeman died in 2009, the painting was displayed at Christie's, King Street, London, before being auctioned in May 2009 in New York City. It sold for $7.9m.

References

Paintings by David Hockney
1967 paintings
Los Angeles in art